The  was an infantry division of the Imperial Japanese Army. Its call sign was the

Origins
The 46th Division was formed  in Kumamoto, simultaneously with 42nd, 43rd and 47th divisions. The formation nucleus was the 66th Independent Infantry Brigade and headquarters of the 6th division. Troops were drawn from the Kumamoto Divisional District (Shikanku) which consisted of Kumamoto, Oita, Miyazaki, and Kagoshima prefectures.

Deployment
The 46th division was initially assigned to Western District Army to strengthen the mainland defenses.

The 46th division was temporarily assigned to 16th Army and ordered to move south in October 1943. The 46th artillery regiment was detached and left behind that time.

The Division's 123rd Regiment landed in Sumba of the Lesser Sunda Islands in late November 1943. Soon the 46th division was reassigned to 19th army. In February 1944, the 147th Regiment landed in nearby Sumbawa island. The divisional headquarters were established on the Sumbawa island. The remaining 145th Regiment was unable to be transported and instead was diverted from Saipan in June 1944 to Iwo Jima under the Lieutenant General Tadamichi Kuribayashi's Ogasawara Corps where it was wiped out in the Battle of Iwo Jima in February - March 1945.

The 19th Army was disbanded on 1 March 1945 and the 46th division was transferred to the 7th Area Army. Consequently, the 123rd and 147th infantry regiments were removed from Sumba and Sumbawa islands, respectively, and sent to Malay Peninsula in April 1945, landing in Singapore. These were disbanded at Kluang, Johor province after the surrender of Japan .

Commanders
 Lieutenant General Takashi Kayashima - 10 June 1943 - 15 October 1943
 Lieutenant General Wakamatsu Tadaichi 15 October 1943 - 14 November 1944
 Lieutenant General Kokubushin Shichiro  14 November 1944 - till disbanded

Headquarters and senior staff at disbandment
 Chiefs of Staff: Colonel Nizeki Eisaku, Lieutenant Colonel Masugi Kazuo, Major Yamamoto Tatsuo, and Major Emi Hideaki
 Adjutant: Lieutenant Colonel Tsuchiya Masanori
 123 Infantry regiment: Colonel Chujo Toyo-ba
 145 Infantry regiment: annihilated at Iwo Jima
 147 Infantry regiment: Colonel Sairenji 
 46th Division tank company: Major Matsunaga YoshiSho
 46th Division signals company: Captain Harada Magokai
 46th Division transport company: Captain Arima Yasunari
 46th Division ordnance company: Major Omoneman Tetsuo
 46th Division labour company: Accountant Lieutenant Santsumori Bun'ichi
 46th Division field hospital: Surgeon Colonel Tanaka Heikichi

See also
 List of Japanese Infantry Divisions

Reference and further reading
 Madej, W. Victor. Japanese Armed Forces Order of Battle, 1937-1945 [2 vols] Allentown, PA: 1981
 HataYu 彦編 "Japanese army and navy comprehensive encyclopedia," second edition, University of Tokyo Press, 2005
 Toyama Misao-Morimatsu Toshio eds "Imperial Army curriculum overview" Furong Shobo Publishing, 1987
 Separate volume history reader Senki series No.32 - Pacific Division military history, Shinjinbutsuoraisha, 1996

Japanese World War II divisions
Infantry divisions of Japan
Military units and formations established in 1943
Military units and formations disestablished in 1945
1943 establishments in Japan
1945 disestablishments in Japan